El Café Chorale is choral ensemble in Costa Rica. It was founded in 1994 by the Costa Rican Choral Institute.

The Choir has defined and archived a proud career based on its versatility and excellence in Choral performances delighting audiences in Costa Rica, Europe, and The United States. Composed of selected professionals and students from several Universities and Academies in the Central Valley of Costa Rica, El Café Chorale is dedicated to the development, study, and diffusion of the vocal repertoire, performing music from the Renaissance to Contemporary style and Latin American Folk Choral Arrangements.

Its participation in International Choral Competitions has been a large success:

 1998 Förderkreis Internationale Chortage Mainhausen, Germany (Second Place, Renaissance, Romantic and Contemporary Style)
 1999 Harmonie Festival, Germany (Gold Medal, First Place, Folk accompanied)
 1999 Harmonie Festival, Germany (Gold Medal, Second Place, Folk a Capella)
 2001 Festival Choral International Neuchatel, Switzerland (finalist)
 2003 Förderkreis Internationale Chortage Mainhausen, Germany (Gold Medal, First Place, Renaissance, Romantic and Contemporary Style)
 2005 Harmonie Festival, Germany (Gold Medal, First Place, Folk a Capella)
 2007 Internationalen Chorfestival Ruhr a Capella
 2011 Harmonie Festival, Germany (Silver Medal, Third Place, Folk a Capella)
 2011 Harmonie Festival, Germany (Bronze Medal, First Place, Folk accompanied)
 2011 Langenselbolder Chorfestival, Germany (First Place, Sacred Music)
 2011 Internationale Chortage Mainhausen, Germany (Third Place, Men's Choir)

El Café Chorale has traveled internationally given an amount of great successful performances in Germany, Austria, Czech Republic, Slovakia, Belgium, Switzerland, England and The United States.

Three times, in the years 1999, 2003, and 2007 the Choir received “The National Prize of Music”, the highest honor in the Arts in Costa Rica.

In the year 2000, The American Choral Directors Association invited El Café Chorale to participate in the Western Division Convention Los Angeles 2000, where the Choir presented both formal and concert workshops.

El Café Chorale has internationally shared the stage with very famous groups such as Gesangverein Liederkranz and Accelerando from Germany, Voca Lisa from Belgium, Pro-Musica from Hungary, San Jose Choral Project, Albert Mc Neil Chamber Singers and Cardinal Singers from the United States, Krynitchka from Greece, Psalmus and Azuoliukas Male Choir of the Philippines Concert Chorus, the Krasnoyarsk Female Chamber Choir of Teachers from Russia, and St George’s Singer from Manchester.

See also
 Music of Costa Rica

External links
 Cafe Chorale web page
 Förderkreis Internationale Chortage Mainhausen
 Harmonie Festival
 Festival Choral International Neuchatel

Costa Rican choirs
Musical groups established in 1994
1994 establishments in Costa Rica